Major recurring characters of the Halo multimedia franchise are organized below by their respective affiliations within the series' fictional universe. The original trilogy's central story revolved around conflict between humanity under the auspices of the United Nations Space Command or UNSC, and an alien alliance known as the Covenant. The artifacts left behind by an ancient race known as the Forerunner play a central role—particularly the ringworlds known as Halos, built to contain the threat of the parasitic Flood.

Bungie founder Jason Jones noted that bringing together the elements of a video game is unmistakably "art", but character designers and artists had to make a "living, breathing world" and populate it with interesting characters and places. The first Halo game's development brought numerous evolutions and revisions to the character's designs and personalities. Characters were also updated to take full advantage of new graphics technologies; for instance, the Master Chief's armor was redesigned in a lengthy conceptual process and the final model was bump mapped. Subsequent games offered opportunities to refine the character's appearances and design.

Halos commercial and critical success has led to large amounts of merchandise featuring the franchise's characters to be produced. The Master Chief, the most visible symbol of the series, has been heavily marketed, with the character's visage appearing on soda bottles, T-shirts, and Xbox controllers. Other merchandise produced includes several sets of action figures. Halos characters have received varying reception, with characters such as the Chief, Cortana, and the Arbiter being well received by critics.

Character design and creation 
The Halo franchise originated with the 2001 video game Halo: Combat Evolved. The game's characters were continually refined through development, as developer Bungie was bought by Microsoft and the platform shifted from the Macintosh to the Xbox. Other Bungie developers would often add input to character development, even if they were not working on the game itself. An outside artist, Shi Kai Wang, developed the early concept sketches of what would eventually become the Master Chief. However upon developing a 3D model, the artists decided the Chief looked too slender, almost effeminate, and subsequently bulked up the character. Early Covenant Elites had a more natural jaw rather than the split mandibles they would later sport; at one point, Jason Jones was also insistent about having a tail on the Elites, but this idea was eventually dropped.

Originally, the game designers decided to hand-key character animations. The animators videotaped themselves to have reference footage for the movement of game characters; art director Marcus Lehto's wife recorded him "running around a field with a two-by-four" for the human marines. By Halo 3, Bungie staff had a special room designed for capturing reference material. Many of the subsequent human character's features were based on Bungie designers, while character animators looked to simian, ursine, insectoid, and reptilian features for the various races of the Covenant. The artificial intelligences of the characters was also deliberately limited to make sure they acted realistically to environmental changes and situations. Later games use motion capture to capture the movement and facial acting of the cast.

Voice acting 

The Halo series features voice work by television and film actors including Ron Perlman, Orlando Jones, Michelle Rodriguez, Robert Davi, and Terence Stamp. Voice acting became more important as Halo: Combat Evolveds sequels were developed; Halo 2 had 2,000 lines of combat dialogue, while Halo 3 has in excess of 14,000 lines. Some actors voiced their lines in remote locations, while others traveled to a studio to record their lines. In interviews, Halos voice actors stated that they had no idea that the games would become such a critical and commercial success. Steve Downes, the voice of the game's protagonist, stated that generally when a voice actor has finished their lines, their involvement with the game ends. As the characters in Combat Evolved were relatively undefined, the voice actors were given leeway to develop their own style and personality.

Aside from major character roles, members of the Halo community and Halo fans have had small roles in the games. The cast from the machinima Red vs. Blue won a lengthy charity auction for a voice role in Halo 3, and do a comedy routine which changes depending on the difficulty level the game is played on. Cast members of the defunct TV show Firefly—Alan Tudyk, Nathan Fillion, and Adam Baldwin—have roles as marines in Halo 3 as well as Halo 3: ODST and Halo 5: Guardians.

United Nations Space Command (UNSC)

Master Chief 

Master Chief Petty Officer John-117, commonly referred to as simply the Master Chief, is the main protagonist and main playable character in many of the Halo games. The character is voiced by Steve Downes, a Chicago disc jockey. He is one of the Spartans, an elite group of augmented soldiers raised from childhood to be super soldiers. Assisted by the artificial intelligence Cortana, he prevents the catastrophic firing of Installation 04 in Halo: Combat Evolved. Developing the character of Master Chief was part of Bungie's efforts to make players invested in playing the game. The character has since become a gaming icon, the mascot of the Xbox, and rated as one of the greatest characters in video games. In live action, the Chief has been portrayed by Daniel Cudmore in Halo 4: Forward Unto Dawn and Pablo Schreiber in the Paramount+ series.

Cortana 

Cortana, voiced in the games by Jen Taylor, is the artificial intelligence (AI) who assists the Master Chief in the video games. She is one of many "smart" AIs, and is based on the brain of Dr. Catherine Halsey; the nature of her construction means she is subject to a finite lifespan. In Halo 4, Cortana begins to succumb to her age, and sacrifices herself to save Chief and Earth from the Forerunner Didact, but Halo 5: Guardians reveals that she had survived the ordeal. Having found access to the Domain, a Forerunner repository of knowledge, Cortana believes that AIs should serve as the galaxy's caretakers, putting her in conflict with her creators. In Halo Infinite, however, after Atriox seemingly defeats Chief which devastates her, Cortana finally destroys herself. Cortana has been called one of gaming's greatest characters, and one of the "50 Greatest Female Characters" and the heart of the franchise. The character's sex appeal has also been a focus on commentary.

Avery Johnson 
Avery Junior Johnson is a Marine sergeant major who leads human forces throughout the Halo series. The character is voiced by David Scully. Johnson and a few other Marines survive the destruction of Installation 04 and are rescued by Cortana and the Master Chief during the novel Halo: First Strike. Johnson plays a larger role in Halo 2, joining forces with the Arbiter to stop Tartarus from activating Installation 05. In Halo 3, the Covenant attempt to use him to activate the Halo Array, but are foiled; when the Master Chief decides to activate the local Halo to stop the Flood infestation, the Forerunner construct 343 Guilty Spark kills him to prevent it. Johnson is featured in The Halo Graphic Novel story, "Breaking Quarantine," and a main character in the 2007 novel Halo: Contact Harvest.

In many ways similar to the stereotype of charismatic black Marines found in other science fiction (such as Sergeant Apone in Aliens whom Johnson was partially based on), some critics found Johnson a flat character. Joseph Staten admitted that Johnson was static in Halo: Combat Evolved, and that despite the character's potential, "he sort of inherited those caricature aspects [from Halo]." Contact Harvest was a chance "to do right" by the character. Luke Cuddy identified Johnson's character arc as closely tied to the series' themes of struggle and sacrifice.
He has been included in critic lists of the best black video game characters.

Jacob Keyes 
Captain Jacob Keyes (voiced by Pete Stacker) is a captain in the UNSC who appears in Halo: Reach, Halo: Combat Evolved, Halo: The Flood, Halo: The Cole Protocol, and Halo: The Fall of Reach. His first chronological appearance is in The Fall of Reach, where, as a young Lieutenant, he accompanies Dr. Catherine Halsey on her mission to screen possible SPARTAN-II Project subjects. During battle with the Covenant over the planet Sigma Octanus IV, Keyes became known for his complicated and unorthodox maneuver which allowed him to win against impossible odds. Keyes leads his ship the Pillar of Autumn to Halo in Combat Evolved. There, Keyes leads a guerrilla insurgency against the Covenant. Captured and assimilated by the parasitic Flood, he is mercifully killed by the Master Chief, who takes Keyes' neural implants to control the ship. Danny Sapani portrays a markedly different iteration of Keyes in the television series.

Miranda Keyes 
Commander Miranda Keyes is the daughter of Jacob Keyes and Catherine Halsey. Miranda appears in Halo 2, Halo 3 and in the final chapter of Halo: The Cole Protocol. In Halo 2 she supports the Master Chief in his battles, and assists Sergeant Major Johnson and the Arbiter in stopping the activation of the Halo Array. In Halo 3, Keyes attempts a rescue of Johnson when he is captured by the Covenant to activate the Ark; she is killed by Truth in the attempt. Keyes was voiced by Julie Benz in Halo 2. Benz said that she loved voiceover work and that it was pure chance she had become the voice of Keyes in the first place. When IGN asked Benz what she thought of her character, she admitted she hadn't played the game. The role was recast for Halo 3, where Justis Bolding assumes the role. Olive Gray portrays a markedly different iteration of Miranda Keyes in the television series.

 Catherine Halsey Dr. Catherine Elizabeth Halsey is a civilian scientist. She works with the military to run the SPARTAN-II Project, creating the most effective weapons humanity has against insurrection, and then in the war with the Covenant. Cortana is derived from Halsey's cloned brain. Jen Taylor, who also voices Cortana, provides the voice and motion capture performance, in Halo: Reach, Halo 4, and Halo 5: Guardians. The character is voiced by Shelly Calene-Black in Halo Legends. Natascha McElhone portrays the character in the television series.

 James Ackerson James Ackerson is a high-ranking UNSC Army colonel. He convinces the Office of Naval Intelligence to fund the SPARTAN-III Project, and vied with Halsey for funding. After an attempt to frustrate Halsey's Spartans, Cortana fakes orders to reassign Ackerson to the front lines of the war. On Mars, he is captured by the Covenant, and executed after leading them on a wild goose chase for a supposed Forerunner artifact on Earth; the ruse is used by Ackerson's brother Ruwan to help the UNSC strike a blow against the Covenant. Ackerson was subsequently killed.

 Franklin Mendez 
Senior Chief Petty Officer Franklin Mendez is the SPARTAN-II's trainer. After teaching the first class of Spartans, Mendez sees additional action fighting the Covenant, before being recruited to train the SPARTAN-IIIs. Initially uncertain of the new Spartans' potential, Mendez trains several companies of the supersoliders. During the events of Ghosts of Onyx he is sealed inside a shield world with Halsey and other Spartans, and after the Human-Covenant War, retires from service.

 Terrence Hood 
Fleet Admiral Lord Terrence Hood (voiced by Ron Perlman) is commander of the UNSC Home Fleet, as well an English noble. During the events of Halo 2 and 3 he defends Earth against the Covenant, staying behind when Master Chief and Arbiter depart for the Ark. In Halo 3s epilogue, he leads a memorial service for those who fell in the conflict. The short story "Rosbach's World" reveals Hood escapes Cortana's attack on earth during the end of Halo 5, ending up along with ONI chief Serin Osman on a safe world. Hood blames himself for the situation due to allowing the Master Chief free rein and falls into a depression. Keir Dullea portrays Hood in the television series.

Serin Osman
Admiral Serin Osman is a former Spartan-II who washed out of the program. Osman was hand-picked by Office of Naval Intelligence leader Admiral Margaret Parangosky to be her successor. After the Human-Covenant War Osman served as the leader of Kilo-5, a black ops team that worked to destabilize humanity's enemies to prevent future war. She later orders the assassination of Catherine Halsey, believing her usefulness is at an end. Thanks to the loyalty of the artificial intelligence Black Box, Osman is evacuated from Earth before Cortana attacks. The character appears in the Kilo-5 Trilogy, Halo: Last Light, Halo: Fractures, Halo: Retribution, Halo 4 Spartan Ops, and Halo Fractures.

 Thomas Lasky 
Captain Thomas Lasky is the captain of the UNSC Infinity. Portrayed by Thom Green, he is a main character in the web series Halo 4: Forward Unto Dawn, which depicts his training at an officer academy and rescue by Master Chief as the Covenant invade and glass the planet. In Halo 4, Lasky (voiced by Darren O'Hare) serves as Infinity's first officer and aids the Chief on the Forerunner world Requiem. When Infinity's captain refuses to listen to the Master Chief and Cortana and leaves Requiem, he is relieved of command and Lasky is promoted. He reappears in Halo 4 Spartan Ops and the Halo: Escalation comic series. In Halo 5: Guardians, Lasky reluctantly sends Spartan Fireteam Osiris after the rogue Spartan Blue Team. When AIs begin pledging loyalty to Cortana en masse, Lasky and Infinity are forced to flee Earth. In Halo: Bad Blood, Lasky and Infinity link up with Blue Team and Fireteam Osiris soon after.

RolandRoland (voiced by Brian T. Delaney) is the current artificial intelligence aboard the UNSC flagship Infinity. Roland's avatar takes the form of a golden World War II fighter pilot. Unlike many human AI, Roland does not join Cortana and her Created, and continues to serve the UNSC. Roland appears in Halo 4 Spartan Ops, Halo 5, Halo: Spartan Assault, and spin-off media, including the Halo: Escalation comic series, Halo: Fractures and Halo: Tales from Slipspace.

The WeaponThe Weapon, portrayed by Jen Taylor, is the Master Chief's new AI companion in Halo Infinite, created by Dr. Catherine Halsey to lock down Cortana for retrieval and deletion aboard the UNSC Infinity. In Halo: Shadows of Reach, Blue Team are sent back to CASTLE Base on Reach to recover important assets for Halsey that hold the key to defeating Cortana. In the game's audio logs, it is revealed that Halsey subsequently used these assets, presumably her remaining cloned brains from creating Cortana, to create the Weapon. The Weapon was supposed to be automatically deleted once her mission was over, but her deletion protocol failed to activate, leaving her stranded in the ring's foundations. Having only been recently created, the Weapon possesses a generally sunny and naive personality and lacks basic knowledge on things such as what the Banished or their component species are.

Six months after her deployment, the Weapon is recovered by the Master Chief following his rescue by Fernando Esparza. Needing help, the Master Chief takes the Weapon on as his new AI companion on a more permanent basis, although he remains distrustful of her, even trying to delete the AI at one point when she falls into danger, much to her fury. The Weapon proves to be an invaluable asset to the Master Chief throughout his journey, leaving her disgruntled over his deletion attempt of her and his continuing distrust. Finally, after watching some of Cortana's memories, the Weapon realizes the truth: she's actually an exact copy of Cortana created by Dr. Halsey in order to fool Cortana's security systems so that she could be locked down. Halsey scrubbed any knowledge from the Weapon that could compromise her and the Master Chief refers to the Weapon as essentially being Cortana if he and Cortana had never met. Horrified and worried that she could end up like Cortana, the Weapon begs the Master Chief to delete her, but he refuses, stating that he wants to trust her. As they continue their journey, the Master Chief and the Weapon discover that it was actually Cortana herself who had prevented the Weapon's deletion following Cortana's defeat as the other AI knew that the Master Chief would need the Weapon's help against the Banished and the Harbinger. In a final message to the Master Chief, Cortana urges him and the Weapon to learn from her mistakes and to become stronger from them and she tells the Master Chief that the Weapon has a lot of potential. With the Weapon's help, the Master Chief kills Escharum and the Harbinger, but he fails to stop the Harbinger from contacting someone else about the location of the Endless. Subsequently, the Master Chief offers to let the Weapon choose her own name as Dr. Halsey did with Cortana and while she has the perfect name picked out, it is not revealed.

Echo-216Echo-216 (real name Fernando Esparza, portrayed by Nicolas Roye) is a Pelican pilot who aids the Master Chief throughout the events of Halo Infinite, and is generally referred to only by his Pelican's callsign. Stranded in space for six months following the defeat of the UNSC, Esparza rescues the Master Chief and accompanies him in his journey across the ring, at first reluctantly as Esparza is mainly concerned with going home. However, over time, Esparza becomes a more willing member of the team. Esparza gradually opens up, revealing that he is actually a civilian engineer who had panicked when the Banished had attacked the Infinity and stole the Pelican in order to escape and that while he had a wife and daughter, they are long dead. Esparza is later kidnapped by Jega 'Rdomnai and tortured in order to draw the Master Chief out for a final battle with Escharum. Esparza is rescued by the Master Chief and the Weapon and he is surprised by the respect that the Master Chief shows to the dying Escharum. Following the Harbinger's defeat, Esparza finally introduces himself properly and he joins the Master Chief and the Weapon in continuing their fight against the remaining Banished forces on the Halo ring.

 Spartans 

Building on the failed ORION Program, Catherine Halsey and the UNSC Office of Naval Intelligence developed the SPARTAN-II program to create an elite corps of supersoldiers that could stem rebellions in the UNSC colonies. The Spartan candidates were kidnapped as children and replaced by flash clones that quickly died afterwards. After grueling training, they were subject to dangerous physical augmentation, and equipped with "MJOLNIR" powered armor. Following in the wake of the SPARTAN-II Project were the SPARTAN-IIIs, children orphaned by the Covenant War who became cheaper, more expendable soldiers. After the war, the UNSC began training Spartan-IVs from adult volunteers. The existence of the Spartans was disclosed to the public to raise morale as the Covenant War continued to go badly.

Fred-104Fred-104 is a Spartan-II and one of the Master Chief's closest friends. He is voiced by Andrew Lowe in Halo: Legends, portrayed by Tony Giroux in Halo 4: Forward Unto Dawn, and portrayed by Travis Willingham in the Halo 2: Anniversary Terminals and in Halo 5: Guardians. Fred survives the fall of Reach, as shown in Halo: First Strike, and assists Master Chief and other Spartans in destroying a Covenant armada massing to attack Earth. In Halo: Ghosts of Onyx, Fred and Blue Team fight the Covenant on Onyx and end up within a Forerunner shield world. They reconnect with the outside world in Halo: Glasslands; though to them only a few days have passed, outside months have. In the Halo: Escalation comic series, Fred and the other members of Blue Team are reunited with the Master Chief, and appears alongside the Master Chief, Kelly and Linda in Halo 5: Guardians.

Linda-058Linda-058 (voiced by Andrea Bogart in the Halo 2: Anniversary terminals and Brittany Uomoleale in Halo 5: Guardians) is an excellent marksman. She appears in both much of the spin-off media and Halo 5: Guardians. After being mortally wounded in Halo: The Fall of Reach, she is placed into suspended animation. In Halo: First Strike she is revived and participates in action against the Covenant. In Ghosts of Onyx she and her fellow Spartans defend Earth from the Covenant, before being sent to the planet Onyx after receiving a message from Catherine Halsey. Following the end of the Human-Covenant war in Halo: Last Light, Linda and Blue Team investigate a Forerunner structure on the politically unstable planet of Gao and get caught in both the machinations of a power hungry leader and the plans of a rogue Forerunner AI, Intrepid Eye. In the Halo: Escalation comic series, Linda and the other members of Blue Team are reunited with the Master Chief, and she fights with Blue Team during the events of Halo 5. Linda is also the main character in the Halo: Lone Wolf comic series.

Kelly-087Kelly-087, voiced by Luci Christian in Halo: Legends, Jenna Berman in Halo 4: Forward Unto Dawn and Michelle Lukes in Halo 5: Guardians, is the Spartan-II's scout and the Master Chief's best friend. Kelly is noted for her incredible speed, even before augmentation. She is initially presumed lost with other Spartans dispatched to Reach during its invasion, but in Halo: First Strike it is revealed she survived. During the events of the novel Halsey kidnaps Kelly and flees with her to Onyx. Kelly appears alongside the Master Chief, Linda and Fred in Halo 5: Guardians.

 Sarah Palmer 
Commander Sarah Palmer (Jennifer Hale) is a Spartan-IV stationed on UNSC Infinity and the leader of the Spartan IVs. She appears in Halo 4, Halo 5: Guardians, Halo: Spartan Assault, "Halo: Shadows of Reach", and the Halo Escalation comic series.

 Edward Buck 
Gunnery Sergeant Edward Malcolm Buck (Nathan Fillion) is a longtime human soldier. In Halo 3: ODST he is the leader of Alpha-Nine, a squad of Orbital Drop Shock Troopers (ODSTs). He is subsequently inducted into the SPARTAN-IV program, and is a playable member of Fireteam Osiris in the video game Halo 5. He makes a brief appearance in Halo: Reach and is the main character of the novels Halo: New Blood and Halo: Bad Blood. In the latter, Buck reunites his old squad Alpha-Nine (minus "Rookie", who died during a previous mission in the timeskip between 3 and 4) for a classified ONI mission following the events of Halo 5. At the end of the novel, Buck decides to return to leading Alpha-Nine full-time and is married to long-time girlfriend Veronica Dare by Infinity's AI Roland.

 Noble Six SPARTAN-B312, also known by his call-sign Noble Six, is a Spartan III who is the main protagonist of Halo: Reach. B312 is the latest addition to Noble Team, a fireteam of fellow Spartan III's and one Spartan II that is stationed on Reach just prior to the events of Halo: Combat Evolved. His identity and background are highly classified due to his prior work with the ONI, and as he is transferred to Noble Team, the Covenant invades the planet. A solitary figure who prefers working alone and gains the nickname "Lone Wolf" as a result, Six earns the respect of his teammates despite their early resentment of him and plays a role in transferring crucial data to Cortana before she travels to Installation 04 on the Pillar of Autumn, also ensuring the ship's safe departure from Reach. However, most members of Noble Team, including Six, perish during the planet's fall to the Covenant and glassing. While characterized as a male in canon, the player can opt to characterize Noble Six as either male or female prior to playing the campaign of Halo: Reach. Six's male and female incarnations are voiced by Philip Anthony-Rodriguez and Amanda Philipson, respectively.

 Jameson Locke Jameson Locke is a Spartan IV who first appeared in Halo 2 Anniversarys both opening and ending with the task of hunting down the Master Chief in Halo 5: Guardians. Mike Colter portrays Locke in both Anniversary and the Nightfall origin movie, and only provided the motion-capture performance for the character in Guardians. Due to scheduling conflicts with Jessica Jones and Luke Cage, Locke's voice acting is replaced by Ike Amadi. He is the current squad leader of Fireteam Osiris, tasked with hunting down Master Chief and Blue Team. Locke kills Jul 'Mdama in single combat and helps the Arbiter defeat the last of the Jul's Covenant forces.

 Orbital Drop Shock Troopers (ODST) 
The Orbital Drop Shock Troopers are an elite special ops component of the UNSC Marine Corps, distinguished by their unique deployment from space onto planetary surfaces through entry-vehicles nicknamed "drop pods", similar to paratroopers. A battalion of ODSTs, codenamed Alpha-Nine, are the primary focus of Halo 3: ODST, with Edward Buck serving as the squad leader and the player assuming the role of "The Rookie" on the squad. Several ODSTs, including Antonio Silva, have a disdain for the Spartan IIs and their abilities, likely stemming from an incident when a 14-year-old John-117 accidentally killed two ODSTs while defending himself from being bullied.

 Covenant 
 High Prophets 

High Prophets, or Hierarchs, are the supreme leaders of the theocratic Covenant. Upon assuming office, each Hierarch picks a new regnal name from a list of names of former Hierarchs, similar to the practice of some Orthodox Patriarchs. In Halo 2, there are shown to be only three; the Prophets of Truth, Mercy, and Regret (voiced by Michael Wincott, Hamilton Camp and Robin Atkin Downes in Halo 2, respectively; in Halo 3, Truth is voiced by Terence Stamp). The novel Halo: Contact Harvest reveals that these three Prophets, originally known as the Minister of Fortitude, the Vice-Minister of Tranquility, and the Philologist, plotted to usurp the throne of the Hierarchs; in the process, they hide the truth that humanity is descended from the Covenant gods, the Forerunners, believing that the revelation could shatter the Covenant. During the course of Halo 2, Regret attacks Earth, and then retreats to Delta Halo. There, he calls for reinforcements, but is killed by the Master Chief. Later, Mercy is attacked by the Flood on High Charity; Truth could have saved him, but left him to die so he could have full control over the Covenant. In Halo 3: ODST, Truth is seen inspecting some Engineers around the Forerunner construct near New Mombasa. In Halo 3, Truth also meets his demise at the hands of the Arbiter when the Prophet attempts to activate all the Halo rings from the Ark. His death becomes the culmination of the Covenant's downfall.

Preliminary designs for the Prophets, including the Hierarchs, were done by artist Shi Kai Wang. According to The Art of Halo, the Prophets were designed to look feeble, yet sinister. Originally, the Prophets appeared to be fused to the special hovering thrones they use for transport; even in the final designs, the Prophets are made to be dependent on their technology. Special headdresses, stylized differently for each of the Hierarchs, adds personality to the aliens and a regal presence.

 Arbiter 

The Arbiter is a rank given to special Covenant Elite soldiers who undertake suicidal missions on behalf of the Hierarchs to gain honor upon their death. They are revered amongst the Covenant for their bravery and skills. In Halo 2, the rank of Arbiter is given to Thel 'Vadamee, the disgraced former Supreme Commander of the Fleet of Particular Justice, which was responsible for destroying Reach. It was under his watch that Installation 04 was destroyed in Halo: Combat Evolved and the Ascendant Justice was captured by the Master Chief in Halo: First Strike. Rather than killing him, the Prophets allow the Commander to become the Arbiter, and to carry on his missions as the "Blade of the Prophets". Eventually, the Arbiter rebels against the Prophets during the Great Schism by dropping the "-ee" suffix from his surname as a symbol of his resignation from the Covenant, and joins his fellow Elites in siding with humanity and stopping the Halo array from firing. Some of his backstory is featured in Halo: The Cole Protocol set about fifteen years before Combat Evolved where the Arbiter, then Shipmaster Thel 'Vadamee, comes into conflict with UNSC forces led by then-Lieutenant Jacob Keyes. The events sow the seeds of doubt in the future Arbiter's mind about the Prophets and their plans. This particular Arbiter is voiced by Keith David; the Arbiter that appears in Halo Wars is voiced by David Sobolov.

Originally to be named "Dervish," the Arbiter was a playable character intended to be a major plot twist. Reception to the character was lukewarm, with critics alternatively praising the added dimension brought by the Arbiter, or criticizing the sudden twist.

 Rtas 'Vadum 
Making his debut in Halo 2, Special Ops Commander Rtas 'Vadum is never named in the game itself, leading to the unofficial nickname of "Half-Jaw" by fans, due to the missing mandibles on the left side of his face. With the release of The Halo Graphic Novel, however, the character was finally named in the story Last Voyage of the Infinite Succor as Rtas 'Vadumee. The character is voiced by Robert Davi.

'Vadum, originally 'Vadumee before the Covenant Civil War, is a veteran Covenant Elite and the second most prominent Elite character in the series after the Arbiter. He carries the Covenant rank of Shipmaster. The Last Voyage of the Infinite Succor explains how he loses his left mandibles; he is injured after fighting one of his friends, who was infected by the Flood. During the early events of Halo 2, 'Vadumee serves as a messenger between the Hierarchs and the Elite Council, as he is seen relaying messages between the two parties in the Prophets' chamber. Surviving the Prophets' betrayal, 'Vadumee joins his brethren in fighting the Brutes, dropping the "-ee" suffix from his surname to symbolize his resignation from the Covenant. 'Vadum aids the Arbiter in attacking a Brute base to capture a Scarab before departing to take control of a nearby Covenant ship.

In Halo 3, 'Vadum is Shipmaster of the flagship Shadow of Intent, and supports Cortana's plan to follow Truth to the Ark. Along with the Arbiter, 'Vadum leaves Earth to return to the Elite's homeworld with the end of the war. Rtas 'Vadum is known for being a quick, smart, and ingenious tactician and an unparalleled fighter, especially with an Energy Sword and is an excellent leader. He expresses great care for his soldiers, even the Unggoy. He is eager to exact revenge on the Brutes after the Great Schism.

'Vadum appears in the novella Halo: Shadow of Intent taking place after the war. Still the Shipmaster of the Shadow of Intent, 'Vadum protects Sangheili space and comes into conflict with a Covenant splinter faction led by two surviving Prophets, Prelate Tem'Bhetek and the Minister of Preparation Boru'a'Neem. The Prelate is shown to have a personal grudge against 'Vadum, blaming him for the death of his family when High Charity fell to the Flood and 'Vadum had the city partially glassed in a failed effort to contain the Flood. After capturing the Prelate, 'Vadum shows sympathy for him and reveals that the Prelate's family may well have been alive when the Prelate departed the city, meaning that Preparation lied to him. 'Vadum's words shake the Prelate's faith in Preparation who is revealed to be planning to use a prototype Halo ring to destroy Sanghelios using the Shadow of Intent to power it. The Prelate sacrifices himself to stop Preparation, leaving 'Vadum with a new outlook following the encounter. Along with getting the Arbiter to relax age-old rules not allowing females to serve in the military, 'Vadum reveals that he plans to use navigation data recovered from the Prelate's ship to seek out the rest of the Prophets and attempt to determine who should be punished as war criminals and who should be pardoned to coexist in peace as innocents.

 Tartarus 
Tartarus (voiced by Kevin Michael Richardson) is the Chieftain of the Brutes, easily recognized by his white hair, distinctive mohawk, and massive gravity hammer known as the "Fist of Rukt". Rough, arrogant, and disdainful of the Elites, Tartarus is completely dedicated to the Prophets' salvific "Great Journey". Halo: Contact Harvest reveals that Tartarus became Chieftain after killing the former Chieftain, his uncle Maccabeus, and seizing the Chieftain's weapon. In Contact Harvest, Tartarus acts as one of the main antagonists, working to destroy the human colony of Harvest and coming into conflict with Sergeant Johnson. During the final battle of the novel, Johnson's life is inadvertently saved when one of Tartarus' own soldiers turns against him, damaging Tartarus' armor and forcing him to retreat. Tartarus makes his first appearance in the novel Halo: First Strike, as one of the first Brutes allowed into the chamber of the High Prophet of Truth. In Halo 2, Tartarus acts as an agent of the Prophets, branding the Arbiter for his failures. The Chieftain later appears when the Arbiter tries to retrieve the Activation Index of Delta Halo. On the Prophets' orders, Tartarus takes the Index and pushes the Arbiter to what was intended to be his death in a deep chasm. Tartarus heads to the control room of Halo with the Index in order to activate Halo, but is confronted by the Arbiter. Blind to the Prophets' deception about the Great Journey, Tartarus activates the ring; the Brute is ultimately killed by the coordinated efforts of the Arbiter with the help of Sergeant Major Johnson, successfully preventing the firing of Delta Halo.

Designs for Tartarus began after the basic shape and design of the common Brutes was complete. Artist Shi Kai Wang added small but distinctive changes to Tartarus' armor and mane in order to distinguish the Chieftain from the other Brutes. The visual design of the Chieftains was later modified for Halo 3, with the seasoned warriors sporting more elaborate headdresses and shoulder pads. In a review of the character, UGO Networks noted that whereas the Elites "are a precision scalpel," Tartarus was a "baseball bat" that smashes everything in its path, a reference to their ceremonial weapons, the Energy Sword and Gravity Hammer, respectively.

Jul 'Mdama
Jul 'Mdama, voiced by Travis Willingham, is the Supreme Leader of a newly formed Covenant splinter faction following the defeat of the Covenant Empire in Halo 3. Calling himself "the Didact's Hand," Jul's faction initially seeks the Forerunner warrior Didact as an ally against humanity. The character appears in Karen Traviss' Kilo-5 trilogy of novels, as well as Halo 4 and Halo 5: Guardians. It was revealed in Halo: Escalation that Jul 'Mdama's faction was only one of many factions self-proclaiming to be a new "Covenant".

First appearing in the Kilo-Five trilogy, Jul is depicted as a member of the Servants of the Abiding Truth, a religious Covenant splinter faction that is opposed to the Arbiter and his emerging Swords of Sanghelios government. However, Jul is shown to have only joined the Servants as they were the best equipped to combat the Arbiter and his forces as Jul did not believe humanity would change and must be stopped while the Arbiter wanted to form a lasting alliance with them. The Servants attempt to defeat the Arbiter ended in catastrophe thanks to the intervention of the UNSC Infinity in the battle. Jul was subsequently captured by the Kilo-Five black ops team and imprisoned on the Forerunner shield world of Onyx. Jul eventually escaped using one of the shield world's slipspace portals and traveled to the Sangheili colony world of Hesduros which had been cut off from the goings-on in the galaxy since before the Covenant civil war. By portraying his experiences on the shield world in a religious light, Jul was able to win over the inhabitants, but learned that his wife had been killed. Grief-stricken and blaming humanity, Jul discovered the coordinates to the shield world of Requiem on Hesduros and began building up a massive following, forming a new Sangheili-led Covenant. Jul's Covenant eventually found Requiem, but were trapped outside for three years as depicted in the Halo 4 Terminals because the planet required the presence of a Reclaimer to open.

In Halo 4, the Master Chief arrives at Requiem in the rear half of the Forward Unto Dawn and comes into conflict with Jul and his forces. The Master Chief's presence causes Requiem to finally open, granting Jul's Covenant access to the planet. Jul eventually leads some of his forces into Requiem's core where the Forerunner known as the Didact is imprisoned. The Didact is able to trick the Master Chief into releasing him and Jul bows down before him. Despite the core's subsequent collapse, Jul manages to escape with his life and allies himself with the Didact against the humans from the Infinity. Jul's alliance with the Didact leaves him with the ability to command the Didact's Promethean soldiers even after the Didact's own defeat. Subsequent to this, Jul brands himself "the Didact's Hand" with his status and ability to control the Prometheans giving him even more power and attracting more followers to his cause.

In Spartan Ops, six months after the Battle of Requiem, the Infinity returns to Requiem which is still occupied by Jul and his Covenant. The forces of the Infinity and Jul's forces battle each other for control over the planet while Jul personally leads the attempt to access the Librarian's AI which Jul wants to use for the power that the Librarian can give to him. In Halo: Escalation, Jul and Halsey work together while Jul faces a mutiny inside of his own forces. Their mission to access the Absolute Record of Forerunner installations, however, fails.

In Halo 5: Guardians, Jul's power has begun to break following all of his defeats and his Prometheans turning against him under the influence of Cortana. On the remote world of Kamchatka, Jul attempts to access the Forerunner Domain with the help of Halsey while his loyal forces battle the Prometheans. However, Jul is unaware that Halsey has betrayed his location to the UNSC due to the threat Cortana poses. He is killed by Spartan Jameson Locke in single combat and Jul's Covenant falls apart soon thereafter.

In Halo: Legacy of Onyx, Jul's two sons are left on the opposing sides of an ongoing conflict on the Onyx shield world. Dural, now the leader of the Servants of the Abiding Truth, believes the Covenant to truly be gone with the death of his father and the destruction of his faction despite the existence of other ex-Covenant splinter factions in the galaxy.

Banished

Atriox

Atriox, voiced by John DiMaggio and Ike Amadi, is the Brute who founded and leads the mercenary organization known as the Banished. Having fought for the Covenant during the Human-Covenant War, Atriox grew disgruntled with the alien empire as his Brute brothers were carelessly used as canon fodder by their Elite masters, a species who had a feuding rivalry with them due to the Brute's strength and aggression challenging their superior status. He also appears in the Halo TV series as a member of the Covenant.

In Halo: Rise of Atriox, he is shown as a Covenant soldier fighting against the UNSC Marines during the war. Atriox chases down a Marine and expresses to him how meaningless he finds the war against the human species to be as his brothers die. With no hatred for humanity, Atriox quickly kills the Marine to complete his mission. Another Brute then reveals that he was spying on Atriox and declares him a heretic for renouncing the Covenant, resulting in Atriox killing him too. Having murdered one of his own and spoken against the Covenant religion, Atriox is sent to be executed by his Elite superiors. Atriox rebels against his punishment, killing the Elite executioner, inspiring a Brute named Decimus and others to overthrow the other Elites in the area. Atriox forms the Banished with them, and leaves the Covenant.

Atriox is shown recruiting more members to the Banished in Hunting Party from Halo: Tales From Slipspace. He is willing to hire from all species, including Elites and humans. Following the Great Schism, a civil war that tore the Covenant apart, a squad of Elite assassins known as the Silent Shadow embarked on a genocidal campaign against the Brutes for revenge. The Silent Shadow squad kills the Brute crew on Atriox's ship until they encounter him. Atriox tells the Elites that he and his Brutes were not responsible for the Great Schism and that they also hate the Covenant. The leader of the squad still expresses hatred to Atriox for being a Brute, to which Atriox responds that "vengeance is petty" and that "vengeance has no reward". The Silent Shadow squad reluctantly kill their leader, and join the Banished as mercenaries.

Halo: The Official Spartan Field Manual further details Atriox's openness to recruiting humans, as well as how his Brutes Chieftains have spread their influence into Brute colonies as well as human criminal enterprises. In Halo: Divine Wind, several Banished humans are mentioned to have accompanied Atriox on his voyage to the Forerunner world known as the Ark.

In Halo Wars 2, Atriox, who had taken over the Ark, reveals himself to Spartan-II Red Team of the UNSC Ship Spirit of Fire who had just arrived. Atriox attacks the Spartans and lets them escape, sending his Banished forces to chase after them. A prolonged battle for territory ensues between the crew of the Spirit of Fire and Atriox's forces. Having lost Decimus and his flagship in the battle, Atriox expresses respect to his enemy for their tenacity, and offers them a chance to leave peacefully rather than be hunted down. Captain Cutter of the Spirit of Fire refuses and successfully captures a Halo ring, recently created by the Ark, from the Banished. Atriox later orders his forces to plunder resources from the ruins of the former Covenant capital, High Charity, and warns them not to go inside. Pavium and Voridus ignore Atriox's orders and accidentally unleash the Flood upon the Ark once more. After the two succeed in killing a Proto-Gravemind, an enraged Atriox confronts them about their actions, having had to divert significant forces from his battle with the UNSC to contain the Flood. Atriox orders his two subordinates to clean up their mess and help the Ark's defenses to finish containing the Flood. The livid Atriox kills a surviving Flood infection form and departs the area.

In Halo: Shadows of Reach, Atriox manages to make contact with his forces in the Milky Way, instructing them to find a Forerunner slipspace portal on the former human colony of Reach. After the portal is activated by the Keepers of the One Freedom – another former Covenant faction allied with the Banished – with the help of their human acolytes, Atriox is able to use the shards of the Forerunner crystal recovered in Halo: First Strike to connect the portal to the Ark and fly through it to Reach in a Banished Lich. Rather than using the portal to bring more reinforcements back to the Ark, Atriox departs to attend to a greater purpose, leaving behind his troops on the Ark to hold it in his absence. The fanatically religious Keepers steal Atriox's Lich to travel to the Ark and fire the Halos while Veta Lopis – undercover amongst the Keepers – passes a warning to the UNSC that Atriox has returned.

In Halo Infinite, Atriox faces the Master Chief in battle on board the UNSC Infinity and defeats him, ultimately throwing the Spartan off of the ship. When the Master Chief is rescued six months later, he discovers that Atriox and his forces have destroyed the Infinity and nearly wiped out all of the UNSC forces on Installation 07. However, Atriox himself is believed to be dead, having apparently been killed when Cortana destroyed a section of the ring in order to stop him from using it. Through echoes of Cortana's memories, the Master Chief learns that the AI had approached Atriox as a representative of his species and destroyed his homeworld when he refused to surrender to her, provoking the Banished leader to seek out a UNSC AI known as the Weapon in order to defeat Cortana. After seeing the consequences of her actions, Cortana sacrificed herself to make things right by stopping the remorseless Atriox. However, Atriox is revealed to have secretly survived and he locates the Endless, a threat imprisoned by the Forerunners long ago on the ring.

In the Halo TV series, a Brute highly speculated by fans to be Atriox and referred to as such by series creator David J. Peterson is introduced as a Covenant military leader, facing off against the Master Chief and Silver Team twice.

Escharum
Escharum, voiced by Darin de Paul, is the War Chief of the Banished and Atriox's old mentor appearing in Halo: Shadows of Reach and Halo Infinite.

In Halo: Shadows of Reach, Escharum coordinates an effort by the Banished to find a slipspace portal on Reach in order to return Atriox to the Milky Way galaxy from where he's stranded on the Ark, having received a message with instructions from Atriox months earlier. By following Blue Team, Castor and the Keepers of the One Freedom are successfully able to locate the slipspace portal and open it, allowing Atriox to return in a Banished Lich with several of his top warriors. Escharum is outraged by Castor's hijacking of the Lich, but on Atriox's instruction, he departs with his men deeper into the Forerunner installation, allowing Castor and his men to depart in Atriox's ship. As a Guardian approaches, drawn by the activation of the slipspace portal, Escharum's intrusion corvette extracts Escharum, Atriox and his men and they flee from Reach to attend to a greater purpose of some kind.

In Halo Infinite, six months after the defeat of the UNSC at Installation 07, Escharum is now the leader of the Banished following Atriox's apparent death at Cortana's hands. Working with a mysterious being known as the Harbinger, Escharum seeks to release the Endless from their millennia-long imprisonment by the Forerunners on the Halo ring with the Harbinger in return agreeing to help the Banished repair and fire the ring. Unlike the rest of the Banished, Escharum is overjoyed by the Master Chief's survival as it leaves him feeling invigorated with the challenge. Appearing to the Master Chief in the form of holographic transmissions throughout his journey, Escharum introduces himself and taunts the Master Chief, challenging him to a final fight between the Spartan and the old War Chief which Escharum calls "a true test of legends." In secret, Escharum is revealed to be terminally ill and dying and he orders his friend Jega 'Rdomnai to bring the Master Chief to him after 'Rdomnai worriedly notes that Escharum's illness is getting worse. By kidnapping the pilot of Echo 216, 'Rdomnai lures the Master Chief to Escharum's base where the Master Chief kills 'Rdomnai and engages in a final battle with Escharum, mortally wounding him. Dying, Escharum proclaims that his passing will only inspire others and he requests that the Master Chief tell the Banished that he had died well. The Master Chief holds Escharum as passes away, surprising the pilot with the respect that he gave to Escharum in his final moments as Escharum was a monster. The Master Chief states that while Escharum was a monster, in the end, he was also a soldier, questioning his choices and hoping that he did the right thing. While the pilot thinks that the death of Escharum means that it is over since he was the leader of the Banished, the Master Chief warns him that it s not and that there will be consequences as there always are.

Keepers of the One Freedom

Castor
A high-ranking Brute appearing in the novels Halo: Last Light, Halo: Retribution, Halo: Silent Storm, Halo: Shadows of Reach and Halo: Divine Wind. In the wake of the defeat of the Covenant, Castor is the leader of the Keepers of the One Freedom splinter faction, a faction of fanatical zealots that still follows the Covenant's religion.

In Halo: Silent Storm, Castor and his best friend Orsun and members of the Bloodstars Covenant special operations group that is hunting the Spartans in the early years of the war. During a battle on a Covenant space station, Castor and Orsun are delayed in joining the comrades against the Master Chief, Kelly, Linda and Fred and only arrive in time to find them all slaughtered by the Spartans. Rather than engage Blue Team, Castor and Orsun flee in Banshees and are picked up by the nearby Covenant fleet shortly after the station is destroyed by nuclear weapons that the Spartans had planted.

In Halo: Last Light, Castor is now the leader or Dokab of the Keepers of the One Freedom Covenant splinter faction. After learning of the presence of a Forerunner AI on the human colony of Gao, Castor launches an attack, aided by the Minister of Protection Arlo Casille who uses the opportunity to launch a coup d'état and overthrow his own government. Castor is eventually mortally wounded during the battle, but the Huragok Roams Alone heals his injuries. Castor decides to let Roams Alone leave and vows revenge upon Casille for his betrayal.

In Halo: Retribution, Castor and the Keepers of the One Freedom have been conducting piracy upon Casille as a form of revenge and they are framed by Dark Moon Enterprises for the murder of a UNSC Admiral and the kidnapping of her family. Since the events on Gao, Castor has been communicating with a "Holy Oracle" – in actuality the Forerunner AI Intrepid Eye who was recovered from Gao by the UNSC – who directed him to build a base on a former Forerunner outpost world while at the same time framing Castor and the Keepers for her own purposes. Intrepid Eye's machinations leads Blue Team and the Ferrets – a special investigations unit of ONI made up mainly of Spartan-III's – to Castor's base where they recover the planted bodies of the Admiral's family and destroy the base and ninety percent of the Keeper forces in the sector with nuclear weapons. Enraged, Castor chases Intrepid Eye's men to the Outer Colony of Meridian where Orsun is killed by one of Intrepid Eye's men with a rocket launcher much to Castor's grief. Castor's forces, Blue Team and the Ferrets eventually foil Intrepid Eye's biological weapon plot, but Castor is left stranded on Meridian with a broken translator and searching for a way off of the moon.

In Halo: Shadows of Reach, Castor and the Keepers are now allied with the Banished along with two other factions of Brutes – the Legion of the Corpse-Moon and the Ravaged Tusks. Castor and his forces are enlisted by Banished War Chief Escharum to help find a Forerunner slipspace portal on the former human colony of Reach that can be used to connect to the Ark and send reinforcements to Atriox. By this point, Castor is aware that the "Oracle" is really Intrepid Eye, but has been out of contact with her for a year and still believes in her guidance regardless. As a result, Castor considers his four-human acolytes to be a gift from the Oracle, unaware that they are actually Veta Lopis and her Ferret team working deep undercover in the Keepers of the One Freedom. By following Blue Team when they arrive on the planet, Castor and his forces manage to locate and open the slipspace portal, allowing Atriox and several of his top warriors to return to the Milky Way in a Banished Lich. Castor and the Keepers then hijack the Lich and fly it to the Ark, intending to use the Ark to fire the Halo rings and begin the Great Journey while Atriox remains behind to pursue a greater purpose of some kind with his forces in the Milky Way rather than returning to the Ark with reinforcements. Castor ignores Atriox's warnings about the thousands of Banished forces remaining on the Ark and convinces Inslaan 'Gadogai, an Elite from the Banished that had accompanied him throughout the book, to join the Keepers' mission.

In Halo: Divine Wind, Castor and his forces ally with a faction of surviving Covenant soldiers that were stranded on the Ark by the Covenant's defeat years before and Intrepid Eye who seeks to fire the Halo Array in order to destroy the Domain and weaken Cortana. It is revealed that in the years since he was stranded on Meridian, Castor has lost most of his forces due to an eradication campaign conducted by ONI thanks to the undercover efforts of the Ferrets, leaving only the Keepers accompanying Castor to the Ark. Castor is opposed by the Ferrets, forces from the UNSC Spirit of Fire and Banished forces under the command of Pavium and Voridus. Although the Keepers and the Covenant succeed in reaching a control facility where Halo can be fired, they suffer heavy losses in the process. Castor finally learns the truth about Halo and the Great Journey from an argument between Intrepid Eye and a Forerunner submonitor, shattering his faith. Castor flees with 'Gadogai as the Spirit of Fire destroys the facility and Intrepid Eye with orbital EMP rounds. Now the last survivors of the Keepers of the One Freedom, Castor and 'Gadogai set out to seek vengeance upon all of their enemies.

 Forerunner 

 343 Guilty Spark 

343 Guilty Spark (or Guilty Spark or just Spark) (voiced by Tim Dadabo) is a robot who appears in the original Halo trilogy. Originally a human named Chakas who was digitized by the Forerunners at the expense of his biological form, Guilty Spark served as the caretaker of the Halo ring Installation 04, where he was a temporary ally, then enemy to the Master Chief. He is severely damaged when he turns on the Master Chief and his allies in order to stop them from prematurely activating Installation 08 to eliminate the Flood, destroying both the fledgling Installation and the main Ark installation in the process. The Halo novels reveal that he had survived his apparent destruction.

Bungie originally wanted Guilty Spark to sound similar to the robot C-3PO. Dadabo noted in an interview that reactions to his character have been hostile, finding Spark highly annoying. He described Spark's character as a "bastard" who strings others along in order to accomplish his ends. An annual Halloween pumpkin carving contest named 343 Guilt O'Lantern is organized by Halo.Bungie.Org; both the contest's title and logo use the character's design and name as inspiration. Gaming site GameDaily listed Guilty Spark as one of the top "evil masterminds" of video games, stating "If HAL-9000 had any distant relatives, [Guilty Spark would] be closest of kin."

 05-032 Mendicant Bias 
05-032 Mendicant Bias ("Beggar after Knowledge" as revealed in Halo: Cryptum) was the Contender-class Forerunner A.I. charged with organizing Forerunner defense against the Flood. It was later defected by Gravemind turning it rampant and against the Forerunners, but was eventually defeated after the firing of the Halo array and broken into sections, one of which was taken to the Ark, while another was left on the Forerunner ship that would eventually be incorporated into the Covenant city of High Charity. It is this section of Mendicant Bias that informs the Covenant Hierarchs of the human's descendance from the Forerunners in Halo: Contact Harvest, prompting the Hierarchs to usurp the Covenant leadership and instigate the Human-Covenant War.

Mendicant Bias is first encountered in Halo 3 on the Ark, as it attempted to communicate with the Master Chief through Terminals, claiming it sought atonement for its defection to the Flood by helping the Spartan and may have been destroyed when the Chief activated the incomplete Halo that the Ark was constructing. However, as the Ark survived the firing, albeit badly damaged, Mendicant Bias may have survived as well.

 Didact 
The Didact, born Shadow-of-Sundered-Star, (voiced by Keith Szarabajka) is a Forerunner military leader  and the Halo 4'''s main antagonist. The Didact developed a deep animosity towards humanity after fighting a war with them that cost him many soldiers, including his own children. The Didact disagrees with the plan to build the Halo Array to fight the Flood, instead proposing a system of "shield worlds" that is ultimately rejected. Going into exile in a kind of stasis within a device known as a Cryptum, he is later awoken by the Forerunner Bornstellar with the help of humans Chakas and Riser, all guided by the Librarian. The Didact imprints his consciousness on Bornstellar, who then becomes the Iso-Didact; when the Ur-Didact is presumed dead after being captured by the Master Builder, Bornstellar assumes the Didact's military role. Unknown to most, the Ur-Didact was actually abandoned in a Flood-infested system where he was captured and tortured by the Gravemind. Though he survived, the Ur-Didact's sanity was severely shaken by this encounter. Spurred to more drastic measures in an effort to stop the Flood, he forcibly composed innocent humans and turned them into mechanical soldiers. Horrified, the Librarian incapacitated the Didact and placed him in a Cryptum on his shield world Requiem, hoping that meditation and long exposure to the Domain would amend his motives and heal his damaged psyche. However, the activation of the Halos severed the Didact from the Domain, and he spent the next 100 millennia alone, with only his own rage and madness to keep him company.

During the events of Halo 4, the Ur-Didact is accidentally released from his Cryptum by the Master Chief and Cortana. He immediately retakes control of the Prometheans and attempts to digitize the population of Earth, but is stopped by Cortana and Master Chief who is made immune to the Composer by an imprint of the Librarian on Requiem. The comic series Escalation reveals the Didact survived this encounter, but the Spartans of Blue Team stop his plans once again. He is apparently digitized by the Master Chief using several Composers, but the Master Chief considers him contained, not dead.

In Halo: Renegades, 343 Guilty Spark, formerly Bornstellar's human companion Chakas who once helped release the Ur-Didact from his Cryptum, learns from the Librarian of the Ur-Didact's release from his Cryptum on Requiem. From the Librarian's reaction to his questions, Spark realizes that the Ur-Didact's threat is currently "not worrisome" and that the Librarian still hopes for her husband to find peace. However, the Librarian sadly admits that she believes the Ur-Didact to be beyond redemption.

 Librarian 
The Librarian (voiced by Lori Tritel) is a highly ranked Forerunner who is married to the Didact. The Librarian spares humanity from extinction after their war with the Forerunners. She convinces the Forerunner council to use the Halos as preserves for fauna in addition to weapons and manipulates the humans Chakas and Riser as well as the young Forerunner Bornstellar into rescuing her husband from his Cryptum on Earth. She ultimately incapacitates and imprisons the Ur-Didact to stop his plans. While she is presumed to have died when the Halo Array was fired, she uploaded various copies of her personality to aid humanity in assuming the Forerunner's Mantle of Responsibility.

In Halo 4, the Master Chief encounters one such copy on Requiem where the Librarian explains some of the history of the Didact, the war between the humans and the Forerunners as well as the Composer. The Librarian reveals that the Master Chief is "the culmination of a thousand lifetimes of planning," the Librarian having guided humanity through their genetic code to reach the eventuality that became the Master Chief. However, the Librarian is unable to explain what she was planning for before they are interrupted by the Didact. At the Librarian's urging, the Master Chief permits her to accelerate his evolution in order to grant the Master Chief an immunity to the Composer, allowing the Master Chief to survive the Didact's later firing of the weapon. In Spartan Ops, taking place six months later, both the UNSC and Jul 'Mdama's Covenant splinter faction search Requiem for this copy of the Librarian. Dr. Catherine Halsey manages to access a shrine containing the Librarian who provides Halsey with the Janus Key and directs her to find the Absolute Record. The Librarian helps Fireteam Crimson track Halsey's signal in an effort to rescue Halsey from 'Mdama and Crimson helps the Librarian transmit herself to the Absolute Record. She later appears there in Halo: Escalation.

In Halo: Primordium, 343 Guilty Spark, once the human Chakas, claims to know where to find the Librarian, suggesting that she has survived. Rescued from an isolated planet by the crew of the salvage ship Ace of Spades in Halo: Renegades, Spark continues his search for the Librarian, which is ultimately revealed to be a search for another of her copies, not the Librarian herself. In a Forerunner structure on Earth beneath Mount Kilimanjaro, Spark attempts to get the Librarian to help him bring back his friends from when he was human or to join them in the Domain, but the Librarian helps Spark see the folly of his plan. Instead, the Librarian helps Spark recognize the friends he has made amongst the Ace of Spades crew. Though the Librarian offers Spark the chance to join her in joining the rest of her copies at the Absolute Record, he decides to remain behind with his friends. The Librarian provides Spark with a coordinate key to "the safe place" and orders him to "find what's missing. Fix the path. Right what my kind has turned wrong." Before departing, the Librarian seemingly communicates with each member of the crew, telling Captain Rion Forge in particular to look after Spark who is more fragile and important than she could ever know and who might still have a role to play in events to come.

In Halo: Point of Light, Spark and Rion Forge search for the mythical Forerunner planet of Bastion using the coordinate key that the Librarian had provided to Spark. Bastion proves to be a Forerunner shield world taking on a form identical to the surface of the Earth that had acted as the Librarian's secret laboratory out of reach of the Forerunner Council. Spark helps another Forerunner Keeper-of-Tools whose mind is uploaded into a Monitor body to launch a ship called Eden before Spark takes over duty as the caretaker of Bastion. Due to the threat of Cortana and her Guardians, Spark moves Bastion to keep it and the Librarian's research into a number of topics out of reach of enemies. The Librarian appears to Rion through visions several times, eventually revealing that she had discovered remnants of the Precursors – the extinct race that had created the Forerunners and the Flood – on her trip to another galaxy and secretly nurtured them on Bastion to ensure the rebirth of the race with a fresh start on a new world outside of the Milky Way, the mission of the Eden.

 Flood 
 Gravemind 

Gravemind (voiced by Dee Bradley Baker) is one of the primary antagonists in the Halo series. The Gravemind is a large, sentient creature of Flood origin, created by the parasite to serve as its central intelligence once a critical biomass has been achieved. It was introduced during the events of Halo 2, where the creature saves both the Master Chief and Arbiter from their deaths, bringing the two face to face in the bowels of Delta Halo. Gravemind reveals to the Arbiter that the "sacred rings" are actually weapons of last resort; a fact the Master Chief confirms. In order to stop Halo from being fired, Gravemind teleports the Master Chief and Arbiter to separate locations, but also uses them as a distraction; Gravemind infests the human ship In Amber Clad, and uses it to invade the Covenant city of High Charity. Capturing Cortana, Gravemind brings High Charity to the Ark in an effort to stop the High Prophet of Truth from activating the Halo network. Although the Master Chief destroys High Charity, Gravemind survives the blast and attempts to rebuild itself on the incomplete Halo. When Halo is activated, Gravemind accepts his fate, but insists that the activation of the ring will only slow, not stop, the Flood. In Halo Wars 2: Awakening the Nightmare, the Gravemind's warning is validated when the Banished inadvertently release a number of surviving Flood forms from High Charitys wreckage. It is also mentioned in the game's menu that while the Gravemind's "most recent physical avatar" was destroyed by the Master Chief, it is "only a matter of time before it rises again". Though the Flood released upon the Ark form a Proto-Gravemind and come close to forming a new Gravemind, the Proto-Gravemind is killed by the Banished and the Flood are once again contained by the Banished and the Ark's Sentinels.

Designed to be a massive, horrifying combination of tentacles and rotting matter, reception to the character was generally mixed. Jeremy Parish of 1UP.com complained that the link between Gravemind and the Flood was never explicitly stated in either Halo 2 or Halo 3 and was hardly seen in the last game.

 Endless 

 Harbinger 
Harbinger (voiced by Debra Wilson) is a secondary antagonist of Halo Infinite who sought to free her race, the Endless, also known as the Xanalyn, from imprisonment by utilizing Zeta Halo. The Forerunners passed judgement on her race for an unspecified crime, possibly even simply being too powerful, sealing them inside genetic repositories. After being awoken by the Banished, she forms a tenuous alliance with Escharum to defeat Master Chief, though she believes herself to be above him. Despite her hatred of the Forerunners, she opposes humanity simply as a means to an end, otherwise having no ill will towards them.

Following Escharum's defeat, Harbinger attempts to use the Silent Auditorium to locate and free the Endless. While she seemingly perishes at Master Chief's hands, she claims to have successfully accomplished this task, raising the attention of Atriox in an ending cutscene.

 Merchandise 
The Halo franchise has produced numerous merchandising partnerships, and the characters of Halo have likewise been featured in a variety of products. The Master Chief, being the symbol of the franchise, has appeared on everything from soda to T-shirts and mugs. At one point, marketers for Halo 3 were planning on producing Cortana-themed lingerie. There have also been several series of licensed action figures produced, with the Halo: Combat Evolved and Halo 2 collectibles being produced by Joyride Studios in several series. For Halo 3, the responsibility of designing the action figures was given to McFarlane Toys; a total of eight series have been announced, with ninth series devoted to commemorate the tenth anniversary of the franchise by re-issuing a few of the earlier figurines along with pieces to construct a buildable plaque of the Legendary icon used in the game for the hardest skill level. Kotobukiya produced high-end figurines. Besides general figures like Covenant Elites and Spartans, figurines produced include the Master Chief, Cortana, Arbiter, Prophet of Regret, Tartarus, and Sergeant Johnson.

 See also 

 Nicole-458 SPARTAN-II from D.O.A. Dead or Alive''

References 

Halo characters
Lists of science fiction characters